Monica Joyce (born July 16, 1958) is an English turned Irish turned American long distance runner.  She is the younger sister of Irish marathoner Regina Joyce.  Both sisters represented Ireland in the 1984 Summer Olympics, Regina in the Marathon and Monica in the 3000 meters.  Previous to the Olympics Monica had represented Ireland at the 1982 European Athletics Championships, the 1983 World Championship and the 1984 World Cross Country Championships.  She also ran in the 1985 World Cross Country Championships, finishing 12th and the IAAF World Women's Road Race Championships finishing 8th.  At home she was the Irish National Champion in the 1500 metres in 1982, 1983 and 1988 with Sonia O'Sullivan a main competitor.  Across the channel, she was the English National Champion in the 5000 metres in 1982 and 1985, beating her sister in 1982.

Both sisters grew up with their parents in Sussex, England.  She was winning cross country races as early as age 11.  Both sisters originally competed for England as junior athletes but switched to Ireland in 1982, based on the citizenship of their parents, for competitive reasons.  Before embarking on her international career, she competed for San Diego State University for two and a half years, finishing second in the 1500 metres at the NCAA Women's Outdoor Track and Field Championships in 1981.   She married her college coach Fred La Plante, who continued to coach her.

She became a U.S. citizen in 2000.  She has continued running into masters age divisions, in 2002 she won the Gasparilla Distance Classic 15K outright at age 43.  At age 50, she beat the W50 World Record in the 5,000 meters at the Mt. SAC Relays, running 16:19.51.   That year she also added the 15K road running W50 world record, running 52:38 at the Gate River Run.  She also added American records in the 5K, 8K and 10K, the latter for a second time with a 30-second improvement.

References

1958 births
Living people
Irish female long-distance runners
World Athletics Championships athletes for Ireland
Olympic athletes of Ireland
Athletes (track and field) at the 1984 Summer Olympics
World record holders in masters athletics
San Diego State Aztecs women's track and field athletes